Ibrahim Hussein Zaki (born 1947) is a politician of the Maldives.

Zaki is a former Cabinet Minister of the Maldives government: from 11 November 1993 to 10 November 1998, he was Minister of Tourism.  He served as the Secretary General of the South Asian Association for Regional Cooperation (SAARC) from 1 January 1992 to 31 December 1993.  He was also appointed Special Envoy to President Mohamed Nasheed.

In November 2006, Zaki, then acting President of the MDP, was arrested for "inciting enmity against the lawful government".

In November 2012, Zaki and his son Mohamed Hamdan Zaki were among the arrested in Hondaidhoo Island in the Maldives along with two other Members of Parliament, in an alcohol and drug related bust., along MDP parliament members Abdulla Jabir and Hamid Abdul Ghafoor. 

Upon release, he went into exile in India, but returned on 12 August 2013 to support the MDP in the upcoming election.  Fresh charges were then forwarded for prosecution by the Police.

References

Living people
1947 births
Maldivian Democratic Party politicians
Government ministers of the Maldives
Foreign Ministers of the Maldives
Secretaries General of the South Asian Association for Regional Cooperation